or  is a traditional Irish song, that came to be known as a rebel song in the early 20th century.  is a cheer, while  means "welcome home".

History
Like many folk songs, the origins of this song are obscure, but several versions of the tune and chorus can be identified.

In 1884 Francis Hogan of Brenormore, near Carrick-on-Suir, then "well over seventy years of age", reported that "this song used to be played at the 'Hauling Home,’ or the bringing home of a wife". The "hauling home" was a ceremony that took place a month after a wedding when a bride was brought to live in her new husband's home. This version consists only of the chorus.

 also records a similar refrain in 1915 from the Barony of Farney, "but the song to which it belonged was lost before my time".

This song has also been associated with the Jacobite cause as the traditional version mentions , referring to Bonnie Prince Charlie and dating the song to the third Jacobite rising of 1745–1746.

The tune appears as number 1425 in George Petrie's The Complete Collection of Irish Music (1855) under the title  and is marked "Ancient clan march". It can also be found at number 983 (also marked "Ancient Clan March") and as a fragment at number 1056, titled "Welcome home Prince Charley".

In the early 20th century it received new verses by the nationalist poet Patrick Pearse and was often sung by members of the Irish Volunteers during the Easter Rising. It was also sung as a fast march during the Irish War of Independence.

The latter title is associated with Pearse in particular as Irish Volunteers used to chant the song during British bombardments of Dublin. This version features the pirate or "Great Sea Warrior" (Grace O'Malley), a formidable power on the west coast of Ireland in the late 16th century. Pearse shows his knowledge of the Jacobite version in the way he adapts it to the new independence cause.

Lyrics

Original version 

Oro, se do bheatha a bhaile, is fearr liom tu na cead bo bainne:
Oro, se do bheatha a bhaile, tha tu maith le ratha.

Oro, welcome home, I would rather have you than a hundred milch cows:
Oro, welcome home, 'tis you are happy with prosperity [in store for you]).

Jacobite Version

Chorus:
Óró, sé do bheatha 'bhaile,
Óró, sé do bheatha 'bhaile,
Óró, sé do bheatha 'bhaile
Anois ar theacht an tsamhraidh.

A Shéarlais Óig, a mhic Rí Shéamais
'Sé mo mhór-chreach do thriall as Éirinn
Gan tuinnte bróig' ort, stoca nó leinidh
Ach do chascairt leis na Gallaibh

Chorus

'Sé mo léan géar nach bhfeicim
Mur mbéinn beo 'na dhiaidh ach seachtain
Séarlas Óg is míle gaiscidheach
Ag fógairt fáin ar Ghallaibh

Chorus

Tá Séarlas Óg ag triall thar sáile
Béidh siad leisean, Franncaigh is Spáinnigh
Óglaigh armtha leis mar gharda
'S bainfidh siad rinnce as éiricigh!

Chorus

Chorus:
Oh-ro, You're welcome home,
Oh-ro, You're welcome home,
Oh-ro, You're welcome home,
Now that summer's coming!

Young Charles, son of King James
It's a great distress – your exile from Ireland
Without thread of shoe on you, socks or shirt
Overthrown by the foreigners

Chorus

Alas that I do not see
If I were alive afterwards only for a week
Young Charles and one thousand warriors
Banishing all the foreigners

Chorus

Young Charles is coming over the sea
They will be with him, French and Spanish
Armed Volunteers with him as a guard
And they'll make the heretics dance!

Chorus

Patrick Pearse Version

Chorus:
Óró, sé do bheatha 'bhaile,
Óró, sé do bheatha 'bhaile,
Óró, sé do bheatha 'bhaile
Anois ar theacht an tsamhraidh.

'Sé do bheatha, a bhean ba léanmhar, 
Do b' é ár gcreach tú bheith i ngéibheann,
Do dhúiche bhreá i seilbh méirleach, 
Is tú díolta leis na Gallaibh.

Chorus

Tá Gráinne Mhaol ag teacht thar sáile,
Óglaigh armtha léi mar gharda,
Gaeil iad féin is ní Gaill ná Spáinnigh,
Is cuirfidh siad ruaig ar Ghallaibh.

Chorus

A bhuí le Rí na bhFeart go bhfeiceam,
Mura mbeam beo ina dhiaidh ach seachtain,
Gráinne Mhaol agus míle gaiscíoch,
Ag fógairt fáin ar Ghallaibh.

Chorus

Chorus:
Oh-ro You're welcome home,
Oh-ro You're welcome home,
Oh-ro You're welcome home...
Now that summer's coming!

Welcome oh woman who was so afflicted,
It was our ruin that you were in bondage,
Our fine land in the possession of thieves...
And you sold to the foreigners!

Chorus

Gráinne O'Malley is coming over the sea,
Armed warriors along with her as her guard,
They are Gaels, not invaders(british) nor Spanish...
And they will rout the foreigners!

Chorus

May it please the King of Miracles that we might see,
Although we may live for a week once after,
Gráinne Mhaol and a thousand warriors...
Dispersing the foreigners!

Chorus

See also
List of Irish ballads
Drunken Sailor

Notes

External links

Covers at WhoSampled
"Oro! Se Do Bheatha Bhaile" as sing by Derek Warfield & The Young Wolfe Tones
"Oro! Se Do Bheatha Bhaile" (Original Jacobite version)

Folk ballads
Irish folk songs
Irish Jacobites
Irish patriotic songs
Jacobite songs
Irish-language songs
The Dubliners songs
Traditional ballads